Coeloria elegans is a species of uncertain validity (taxon inquirendum) of stony corals (Scleractinia). It was first described by Hermann Rehberg in 1891, from a specimen found in Rockhampton, Queensland.

References 

 Fautin, Daphne G. (2013). Hexacorallians of the World.
 Rehberg, H. 1892. Neue and wenig bekannte Korallen. Abhandlungen aus dem Gebiete der Naturwissenschaften Hamburg 12: 1-50.

Scleractinia
Corals described in 1891